Oswald Fred Boucke Ph.D. (1881–1935) was an American economist. He was a professor at Pennsylvania State University. He is mostly known as the author of The Development of Economics published in 1921.

Works
 (1916). Rising Costs of Living, George Banta Publishing Company.
 (1920). The Limits of Socialism, The Macmillan Company.
 (1921). The Development of Economics, 1750-1900, The Macmillan Company.
 (1922). A Critique of Economics, Doctrinal and Methodological, The Macmillan Company.
 (1925). Principles of Economics, The Macmillan Company.
 (1932). Laissez Faire and After, Thomas Y. Crowell Company.
 (1933). Europe and the American Tariff, Thomas Y. Crowell Company.

Further reading
 Bradford, Edward A. (1920). "Theoretical Beneficence of Socialism," The New York Times, September 12.
 Flubacher, Joseph F. (1950). The Concept of Ethics in the History of Economics, Vantage Press, Inc.
 Stark, Werner (1994). History and Historians of Political Economy, Transaction Publishers,

References

External links
 
 Works by O. Fred Boucke, at JSTOR
 Works by O. Fred Boucke, at Hathi Trust

1881 births
1935 deaths
American economics writers
American male non-fiction writers
20th-century American economists
Place of birth missing
American economists
20th-century American male writers